Clarence D. Rappleyea Jr. (November 2, 1933 – September 4, 2016) was an American lawyer and politician from New York.

Biography
Rappleyea Jr. was born on November 2, 1933, in Norwich, Chenango County, New York. He attended Wagner College. He graduated A.B. from SUNY Albany in 1957, and J.D. from Cornell Law School in 1962. He was admitted to the bar in 1964, and practiced in Norwich. He also entered politics as a Republican, and was City Attorney of Norwich from 1970 to 1973.

He was a member of the New York State Assembly (122nd D.) from 1973 to 1995, sitting in the 180th, 181st, 182nd, 183rd, 184th, 185th, 186th, 187th, 188th, 189th, 190th and 191st New York State Legislatures. He was Minority Leader from 1983 to June 1995, and resigned his seat in July 1995.

He was Chairman of the New York Power Authority from July 1995 to January 31, 2001.

In January 2001, the administrative head-office of the Power Authority, in White Plains, Westchester County, was named in his honor as the "Clarence D. Rappleyea Building". Rappleyea died on September 4, 2016, at the age of 82.

References

1933 births
2016 deaths
People from Norwich, New York
Republican Party members of the New York State Assembly
Wagner College alumni
University at Albany, SUNY alumni
Cornell Law School alumni
New York (state) lawyers
20th-century American lawyers